The William C. Whitney House was a mansion located on 871 Fifth Avenue and 68th Street in the Upper East Side of Manhattan, New York City.

It was originally constructed for Robert L. Stuart who died before it was completed.  It was next sold to  Amzi L. Barber before it came into the ownership of William C. Whitney in about 1897.

References

Further reading

External links 

Houses in Manhattan
Fifth Avenue
Upper East Side
Demolished buildings and structures in Manhattan